Küçükbakkalköy is a neighborhood in the municipality of Ataşehir on the Asian side of Istanbul, Turkey. It is bounded on the northwest, north, and northeast by the Atatürk neighborhood, on the southeast by the Kayışdağı neighborhood, on the south by the İçerenköy neighborhood, and on the west by the Barbaros neighborhood.

The name Küçükbakkalköy means "little grocery village." The name is said to come from the market held in the Greek village that formerly existed there. The neighborhood was referred to as Pakal-kioi (Πακαλ-κιοι) on a Greek tombstone dated 1875 in a cemetery in the neighborhood.

The neighborhood is said to date from Byzantine times, with the neighborhood's Acısu Çeşmesi ("bitter water fountain") thought to be part of an old ayazma.

Küçükbakkalköy is one of the historic Romani people in Turkey (Gypsy) neighborhoods of Istanbul, along with Sulukule, Selamsız, Çürüklük, Tophane, Çayırboyu, and Lonca. In 2006, there were reported to be 240 Romani households in the neighborhood.

References

External links
İstanbul Şehir Rehberi. URL: http://sehirrehberi.ibb.gov.tr  

Neighbourhoods of Ataşehir